Cemetery Shoes is an album by Johnny Dowd, released in 2004.

Track listing
"Brother Jim" – 3:33
"Garden of Delight" – 3:02
"Whisper in a Nag's Ear" – 3:03
"Rest in Peace" – 3:50
"Wedding Dress" – 4:52
"Shipwreck" – 3:24
"Dear John Letter" – 2:23
"Easter Sunday" – 2:49
"Christmas Is Just Another Day" – 3:29
"Dylan's Coat" – 3:32
"Rip Off" – 2:54

References

2004 albums
Johnny Dowd albums